Roger Grenier (19 September 1919 – 8 November 2017) was a French writer, journalist and radio animator. He was Regent of the Collège de ’Pataphysique.

Biography 
As a youth, Grenier lived in Pau, where Andrélie opened a shop selling glasses.
During the Second World War, he attended classes taught by Gaston Bachelard at the Sorbonne while participating in the French Resistance before actively participating in the 1944 liberation of Paris. In his memoir Paris ma grand'ville, Grenier describes being briefly arrested and narrowly avoiding execution by the Occupation forces on the boulevard Saint-Germain. He was only able to escape after an argument in German broke out among his captors. After the Liberation of Paris, he joined Albert Camus at the newspaper Combat. Grenier later went on to write for the newspaper France Soir. As a journalist, he followed post-war trials which inspired his first essay in 1949 Le Rôle d'accusé. He left professional journalism in 1964 to assume a position on the editorial board of the prominent French publishing house Gallimard.
A true man of letters, Grenier was actively involved in many aspects of literary production and criticism. In addition to working as a radio host and a writer for television and cinema, he was a member of the board at Gallimard from 1964 up until his death. Young authors frequently sought out his advice and submitted manuscripts to him for consideration. Grenier was well connected among French authors of his time, such as Joseph Kessel and Albert Camus (whose works Grenier edited after Camus died in 1960), and writers abroad, such as William Faulkner and Yukio Mishimo. His own writing has been recognized by some of the most prominent literary institutions in France. He is recipient of the Grand prix de l'Académie française in 1985 for his body of work of more than thirty works: novels including the best-sellers Le Palais d'hiver 1965 and Ciné-roman Prix Femina in 1972, as well as essays on Chekov and F. Scott Fitzgerald and memoirs.
He is best known in the United States for his work The Difficulty of Being a Dog (Les larmes d'Ulysse), translated by Alice Kaplan. Until his death, he was writing and a busy conference attendee, speaking about his works, literature, Gallimard, or his friends: Albert Camus, and Brassaï.

Works 
 2011 Le palais des livres, translation  by Alice Kaplan, Palace of Books, University of Chicago Press, 2014, . See an excerpt.
 2010 Dans le secret d'une photo,  translation  by Alice Kaplan, A Box of Photographs, University of Chicago Press, 2013, . 
 2008 Tchékhov - Récit d'un inconnu et autres nouvelles, préface and dossier, « Folio »
 2007 Instantanés, souvenirs
 2006 Trois années after Anton Chekhov's novel, theatre, created in Paris at Petit Montparnasse
 2005 Andrélie, traits et portraits, Mercure de France
 2003 Trois tortues et quelques autres, Gibraffaro ???
 2003 Une nouvelle pour vous, novels
 2001 Fidèle au poste
 2001 Roger Grenier ou le droit de se contredire, conversation with Danielle Stéphane, La Passe du vent
 2000 Le Veilleur, novel
 1998 Les Larmes d'Ulysse, translation  by Alice Kaplan, The Difficulty of Being a Dog, University of Chicago Press, 2000, . See an excerpt.
 1997 Quelqu'un de ce temps-là, novels
 1994 Trois heures du matin Scott Fitzgerald, essay
 1993 La Marche turque, novels
 1992 Regardez la neige qui tombe. Impressions de Tchekhov, essay, Prix Novembre Rééd. Gallimard, coll. « Folio », 1997
 1991 Villas anglaises à Pau, photographs by Anne Garde, éd. Marrimpouey
 1991 Partita, novel
 1989 Pascal Pia ou Le droit au néant, essay
 1988 Rues, 1934–1988, photographs by J. Dubois, Nathan
 1988 La Mare d'Auteuil, novel
 1987 Albert Camus, soleil et ombre : une biographie intellectuelle, essay, Prix Albert Camus, Rééd. 1991,  Albert Camus, a cura di Roger Grenier, Milano,Bompiani, 1988. Réed. 1992
 1987 Un guide intime, Prague, éd. Autrement 
 1987 Brassaï, essay
 1986 Le Pierrot noir, novel, Rééd. Gallimard, coll. « Folio », 1996, Another November, Bison Books, 1998
 1985 Il te faudra quitter Florence, novel 1985, Rééd. Gallimard, « Folio », 1994
 1983 Oeuvres complètes d'Albert Camus, two volumes, Club de l'honnête homme
 1982 La Fiancée de Fragonard, novels
 1982 Album Camus. Commented iconography, La Pléiade
 1980 La Follia, novel
 1979 Un air de famille, tale
 1978 Iscan, éd. Horay, coll. « Le Territoire de l'œil »
 1977 La Salle de rédaction, novels
 1975 Le Miroir des eaux, Prix de la nouvelle de l'Académie française
 1972 Ciné-roman, Prix Femina, Rééd. Gallimard, coll. « Soleil », 1973 et « Folio », 1995, TV adaptation in 1978
 1972 Une maison place des fêtes, novels
 1971 Avant une guerre, novel
 1971 Claude Roy
 1965 Le Palais d'hiver, novel, Rééd. Gallimard, coll. « Folio », 1973
 1961 Le Silence, novels, Rééd. 1984
 1960 La Voie romaine, novel
 1958 Les Embuscades, novel, Rééd. Gallimard, coll. « Folio », 1980
 1953 Limelight. Les Feux de la rampe, novel after Charles Chaplin's scenario
 1953 Les Monstres, novel
 1949 Le Rôle d'accusé, essay

References

External links 
 

1919 births
2017 deaths
Mass media people from Caen
Writers from Caen
20th-century French dramatists and playwrights
21st-century French dramatists and playwrights
20th-century French journalists
21st-century French journalists
French memoirists
Pataphysicians
Prix Femina winners
Prix Décembre winners
Prix Roger Caillois recipients
Commandeurs of the Ordre des Arts et des Lettres
20th-century French male writers
21st-century French male writers
French male non-fiction writers